"Lean on Me" is a song by American DJ trio Cheat Codes featuring American singer Tinashe. It was released on May 6, 2021, as the ninth single from their debut studio album Hellraisers, Pt. 1. It was written by Ivy Adara, Adam Halliday, Tinashe, B HAM, Trevor Dahl and Ryan Ogren, who also produced with the last three and Prince Fox.

Background
Tinashe told Elite Daily: “This song is really on brand with everything we're going through, I think that's probably why I connected with it so much. I think we've all been through quite the year and we've all had ups and downs. It's really rewarding to see the type of people who have come through for us and have been there for us. It's all about friendship and love, and those types of relationships that have really kept us all going."

"Lean on Me" is a song for fans who have felt isolated amid the COVID-19 pandemic, and talks about the importance of friendship.

Music video
The music video was released on May 26, 2021. The video tells a story about overcoming difficult times with the help of others.

Track listing

Charts

Weekly charts

Year-end charts

Release history

References

2021 songs
2021 singles
Cheat Codes (DJs) songs
Tinashe songs
Songs written by Ryan Ogren
Songs written by Tinashe
Songs written by Ivy Adara